Augustin Janssens (born 24 September 1930) was a Belgian footballer. He played in nine matches for the Belgium national football team from 1952 to 1956. He was also named in Belgium's squad for the Group 2 qualification tournament for the 1954 FIFA World Cup.

References

External links
 

1930 births
Possibly living people
Belgian footballers
Belgium international footballers
Place of birth missing
Association footballers not categorized by position